Fabio Zúñiga (born 28 November 1979) is a former Colombian footballer who played as a defender.

Career
Zúñiga played in the 2004 Categoría Primera A for Cortuluá, before leaving for Deportes Quindío. He left Deportes Quindío in 2008.

Career statistics

Club

Notes

References

1979 births
Living people
Colombian footballers
Colombian expatriate footballers
Association football defenders
C.D. Dragón footballers
Cortuluá footballers
Deportes Quindío footballers
Expatriate footballers in El Salvador
Colombian expatriate sportspeople in El Salvador